Olivibacter soli is a Gram-negative, aerobic, non-spore-forming, rod-shaped, heterotrophic and non-motil  bacterium from the genus of Olivibacter which has been isolated from Korea.

References

External links
Type strain of Olivibacter soli at BacDive -  the Bacterial Diversity Metadatabase

Sphingobacteriia
Bacteria described in 2008